Nikita (Nikifor) Alekseyevich Izotov (— January 14, 1951) was a Soviet coal miner. He is sometimes referred to (at least by specialists) as the "First Stakhanovite", because he was the first Soviet worker singled out by the press for a superhuman act of labor. In his case, he was praised for having mined far more coal than anyone else—dozens of times the quota.

For a brief period of time, beginning with a May 11, 1932, article in Pravda, Izotov was held up as a model worker, giving rise to the short-lived movement of "Izotovism", which was later eclipsed by Stakhanovism. This movement later ended during the de-Stalinization era.

See also

References

External links 
 Russian biography

1902 births
1951 deaths
People from Kromskoy District
First convocation members of the Supreme Soviet of the Soviet Union
Recipients of the Order of Lenin
Recipients of the Order of the Red Banner of Labour
Propaganda in the Soviet Union
Russian coal miners
Soviet coal miners